Radnitz may refer to:

Robert B. Radnitz (1924–2010), German film producer
German name of the Czech city Radnice